The Jersey Football Combination is the senior football league on the island of Jersey and is run by the Jersey Football Association.

Although the league is affiliated with the English FA, it does not form a part of the English football league system.

Each year, the league champion plays the champions of Guernsey's Priaulx League for the Upton Park Trophy.

History
Originally, the Jersey Football Combination consisted of five divisions, with the Premiership and Championship open to first teams, with separate leagues for reserve sides.

However, from the start of the 2015-16 season all first-team sides play in the Premiership, with a mid-season split into two divisions.

However, after one season this was scrapped and the format changed again. From the 2016-17 season onwards the top 8 teams play in the Premiership and the other 7 teams play in the Championship.

The Jersey Football Combination also selects a side to play in the FA Inter-League Cup. In 2012, the Jersey team qualified for the 2013 UEFA Regions' Cup. where they were eliminated in the group stage.

Clubs
At the beginning of the 2018-19 season there were 7 teams playing in the Jersey Premiership and 6 teams in the Jersey Championship.

First Tower United (Championship)
Grouville (Championship)
Jersey Wanderers (Premiership)
Rozel Rovers (Premiership)
Sporting Academics (Championship)
St. Brelade F.C (Premiership)
St. Clement (Premiership)
St. John (Championship)
St. Lawrence (Championship)
St. Ouen (Premiership)
St. Paul's (Premiership)
St. Peter (Premiership)
Trinity (Premiership)

Premiership

Champions
Source:

All-Time Premiership Table
All-Time Jersey Premiership table from the start of the 2011-12 season up to the end of 2017-18 season.

Numbers in bold  are the record (highest either positive or negative) numbers in each column.

League or status at 2018-19:

All-time top scorers
Records began from the start of the 2011-12 season

Bold denotes players currently playing in the Jersey Premiership.

Records 
Since the start of the 2011-12 season

Titles
Most titles: 5, St. Paul's
Most consecutive title wins: 5, St. Paul's (2013-14 to 2017-18)
Biggest title-winning margin: 14 points, twice; 2011–12 Jersey Scottish (41 points) over St. Paul's (27 points) and 2016-17 St Paul's (54 points) over Jersey Wanderers (40 points)
Smallest title-winning margin: 0 points and 7 goal difference – 2015-16; St. Paul's (+33) over Jersey Scottish (+26).

Goals
Most goals scored in a season: 88, St. Paul's (2016–17)
Fewest goals scored in a season: 9, Grouville (2017–18)
Most goals conceded in a season: 92, Grouville (2017–18)
Fewest goals conceded in a season: 10, St. Paul's (2014–15)
Best goal difference in a season: 71, St. Paul's (2016–17)
Most goals scored at home in a season: 37, St. Paul's (2016–17)
Fewest goals scored at home in a season: 5
Rozel Rovers (2012–13) 
Grouville (2013–14) 
St. Clement (2015–16)
Most goals conceded at home in a season: 40, Grouville (2017–18)
Fewest goals conceded at home in a season: 3, St. Paul's (2014–15)
Most goals scored away in a season: 51, St. Paul's (2016–17)
Fewest goals scored away in a season: 3, Grouville (2017–18)
Most goals conceded away in a season: 54, Jersey Portuguese (2016–17)
Fewest goals conceded away in a season: 5, Jersey Scottish (2014–15)

Points
 Most points in a season: 54, St. Paul's (2016–17)
 Fewest points in a season: 1, Grouville (2017–18)
 Most points in a season without winning the league: 44, Jersey Scottish (2014–15)
 Fewest points in a season while winning the league: 34, St. Paul's (2015–16)
 Most points in a season while being relegated: 20, Trinity (2015–16)
 Fewest points in a season while surviving relegation: 14, St. Ouen (2013–14)

Le Riche Cup
The Le Riche Cup is the main cup competition in Jersey. Every final has been played at Springfield Stadium, St Helier.

Finals

Wheway Trophy
The Wheway Trophy is the second most important cup competition in Jersey, which also includes the top 3 clubs from Guernsey. Every final has been played at Springfield Stadium, St Helier.

Finals

Championship

Promotions to Premiership
A record of every club to have been promoted to the Jersey Premiership

a. Rozel Rovers beat St. Lawrence 3 - 0 (AET) in the Premiership Play-Off

List of Premiership Seasons

2017-18

The 2017–18 Jersey Premiership is the 43rd season of the Jersey Football Combination, the top Jersey professional league for Jersey clubs, since its establishment in 1975. The season started on 9 September 2017 and finished on 26 May 2018.

St. Paul's are the defending champions, while St. Clement and Grouville have entered as the promoted teams from the 2016-17 Jersey Championship.

League table

(C) = Champions,
(R) = Relegated

Results
Each team plays each other three times meaning that each team will play 18 games in total

1st set of results

2nd set of results

a Home Walkover given to St. Paul's

Players

Top scorers

Hat-tricks

Note
4 Player scored 4 goals;
7 Player scored 7 goals; (H) – Home ; (A) – Away

2018-19

The 2018-19 Jersey Premiership is the 44th season of the Jersey Football Combination, the top Jersey professional league for Jersey clubs, since its establishment in 1975.

St. Paul's are the defending champions, while Trinity have entered as the promoted team from the 2017-18 Jersey Championship.

League table

(C) = Champions

Results
Each team plays each other three times meaning that each team will play 18 games in total

1st set of results

2nd set of results

Players

Top scorers

Hat-tricks

Note
4 Player scored 4 goals;

See also 

 List of association football competitions

References

External links
 Results Website

Football leagues in Jersey
Sports leagues established in 1975